Xenon monochloride (XeCl) is an exciplex which is used in excimer lasers and excimer lamps emitting near ultraviolet light at 308 nm. It is most commonly used in medicine. Xenon monochloride was first synthesized in the 1960s. Its kinetic scheme is very complex and its state changes occur on a nanosecond timescale. The excited state of xenon resembles halogens and it reacts with them to form excited molecular compounds.

Introduction 

Molecules that are only stable in electronically excited states are called excimer molecules, but may be called exciplex molecules if they are heteronuclear. The exciplex halides constitute an important class of rare gas halides with formula RgX. Rg is the noble gas, and X is the halogen. These molecules are de-excited by emitting a photon whose energy is some Electronvolts. Therefore, the wavelength of the light produced is in the visible or ultraviolet spectra. Gas or gaseous mixtures that may lead to the formation of these molecules is a quasi-ideal laser medium since the population inversion is directly obtained when the excimer is formed. The other consequence of the unstable ground state is that the excimer or exciplex species must be generated by an external excitation (either through a discharge, an electron beam, microwave, or radiation). At least two gases must be used to generate exciplexes: a halogen donor and a rare gas. However, as shown in Table 1, not all rare gas halide molecules lead to the development of lasers; some may not even exist. Multiple molecules and applications have been developed.

{| class="wikitable" style="text-align:center"
|+ Table 1. Properties of rare-gas halides. D – molecule is dissociative and does not exist. F – observed fluorescence. L – molecule with laser effect.
! Halogen/Rare gas !! Helium !! Neon !! Argon !! Krypton !! Xenon
|-
| Fluorine || D || F & D || L || L || L
|-
| Chlorine || D || D || F & D || L || L
|-
| Bromine || D || D || D || F & D || L
|-
| Iodine || D || D || D || D || F & D
|}

Several review articles related to xenon chloride laser technology and its applications have been published.

Some authors stress the importance of accurately determining the kinetics of the laser medium when rare-gas halides are involved. Recent results have provided insight into the physical chemistry of the laser medium. Spectroscopic investigations are limited to the visible-near ultraviolet region where exciplex lasers operate. Only binary gas mixtures of xenon and a chlorine donor, or ternary mixtures that also include a buffer gas (a rare gas indicated by Rg) will be considered.

Although discharge lamps based on low-pressure mixtures of xenon and a chlorine donor emit incoherent light, they are reliable and easy to operate.

History 

The idea that the noble gases can form halides arose in the early 1920s: A. von Antropoff and Oddo suggested that krypton and xenon may form bromides and chlorides. In 1933, Yost and Kaye unsuccessfully tried to synthesize xenon chloride by illuminating a mixture of xenon (70 torr of pressure) and chlorine (225 torr) with a mercury-vapor lamp.

Xenon monochlorides were first synthesized in 1965. Later, solid  and  compounds were synthesized at low temperatures.

In 1973 Riveros et al. synthesized  ions in the gaseous phase at a pressure of 10−4 torr. This ionic molecule attracted little interest.

This emission was obtained by mixing xenon atoms with chlorine gas  or other chlorinated compounds (NOCl and ). The excitation was provided by a cold cathode discharge; the total pressure was a few torr. Months later, Ewing and Brau reported lasing from a XeCl film 2Σ1/2+ → 2Σ1/2+ at 308 nm, which was most promising for industrial applications. The preferred chlorine donor for XeCl laser is HCl. The reasons given are:

 Low absorption cross section at 308 nm of the order of 10−19 cm2. The HCl concentration does not substantially affect the laser's output energy.
 Less toxic than chlorine.
 Generates a post-dissociation excimer laser, which is much better than other chlorine donors. 16,000 consecutive excimer lasers pulses were obtained without affecting energy output.
 The constant rate of vibrational excitation and dissociative electron attachment are more favorable for HCl than for other chlorine donors.

The first  laser was developed in 1980. This type of laser is likely to be tunable over a wide range of wavelengths (30 nm) in the visible spectrum. This is true even if the absorption phenomena occur on the side of shorter wavelengths and therefore limits the laser action at the red region of the electromagnetic spectrum from light emission. Solid state experiments with  suggest that the gaseous state is more suitable for the development of this type of laser. The measured amplification was correct in the solid state. The liquid state seems like an ideal dye laser although implementation seems complex and costly. Presently, the Cl laser has not been industrially developed. Unlike XeCl, the best chlorine donor is  while no laser action occurs when using HCl.

Four molecules are a priori synthesized in the mixtures. Note particularly the possibility of synthesizing these under the experimental conditions of lasers and their roles.

XeHCl was observed in a gaseous medium. However, this molecule has only been detected via emission spectra in the microwave, radio and far infrared regions, but with emission predicted by two theoretical studies at 232 nm and 129 nm. Note, however, that when nearly in aggregate, it is more likely to be stable at the solid state.

XeH has three known emission lines. They were observed at 190 nm, 250 nm and 660 nm. However, they have never manifested in the laser spectra, which leads to the assumption that XeH is not formed under the experimental conditions. Conversely, the  ion is formed in the mixtures used in lasers.

 + Xe →  + HCl (80 ± 10%)

 + Xe →  + HCl (20 ± 10%)

The rate constant of the entire process is 6.4 cm3s−1 (± 20%).

 ion is a pivotal precursor in the formation of the exciplex molecule.

XeCl exciplex

The structure of the XeCl molecule 

The potential curves presented in Figure 2 are the results of theoretical and experimental works.

Common characteristics for all halide states of the noble gases includes a group of related excited states B, C and D and a lower group of dissociatively or weakly bound states A and X. States B, D and X have Σ symmetry (Λ = 1/2) while the C state has π symmetry (Λ = 3/2). The state A is itself split into two sub-states, a symmetry Σ, A1/2 and the other symmetry π, A3/2.

The ionization potential of noble gases in their lowest excited state is close to the electron affinity of halogen atoms. Thus, the rare gas halide molecules are formed by an ionic bond since the excited electron of the noble gas is partly transferred to the halogen atom. The molecule so formed is therefore stable as is the case of the states B, C and D.

This electron transfer does not occur with ground state atoms. As the rare gas atoms are not reactive. This is the case for states A and X.

The B, C and D states 

The spin-orbital splitting of the  ion into two states ( and ) is important; also the states B and D to which they are correlated are significantly far away. For the minimum potential curves corresponding to almost the same value of the internuclear distance (re#0.3 nm), the energy difference measured experimentally is about 9940 cm−1.

Potential curves of the states B and C intersect adiabatically with a potential curve correlated to Xe* + Cl at large internuclear distances: 7.1 nm experimentally and 7.19 nm and 6.3 nm theoretically. A more recent theoretical investigation specifies these intersection phenomena. States B and C merging at long-distance, intersect two successive potential curves correlated to Xe* + Cl. The lowest correlated to Xe + Cl is 7.25 nm and after that, the next correlated to Xe + Cl is intercepted at 18.68 nm. As this intersection occurs at a great distance, the ionic character of the binding of these states near the equilibrium internuclear distance re is virtually unaffected.

This situation is slightly different for state D that crosses these two potential curves at a much shorter distance. Indeed, state D intersects Xe + Cl
() only at 0.89 nm and Xe + Cl (2P3/2) at 1.02 nm.

The distinction between states B and C is that they are correlated with  ions whose semi-occupied orbital p is in a plane parallel to the internuclear axis for the state B and perpendicular to this axis for the state C.

On an examination of the energy position of the potential curve of states B and C, their proximity results in some difficulty. the values of the energy gap (EB – EC) between the two states is enumerated in Table 2. The data is highly dispersed; computed values, in particular, are far removed from all experimental values. These were determined mostly from the intensity ratios of the two emissions  centered at 308 nm and 345 nm, either with or without corrections by the participation of transition (B → A). The most direct measure is given by Jouvet et al. Excitation spectra of  directly provide the energy difference between the vibrational levels v′=0 and v″=0 which correspond respectively to the B and C states. This value of 90 cm−1 is close to other measurements from studies in kinetics.

{| class="wikitable" style="text-align:center"
|+ Table 2 Energy gap (EB – EC) between the states B and C of XeCl.
! EB – EC (cm−1)
! Process
! Year
! Reference
|-
| −1489
| C
| 1977
| 
|-
| −560
| C
| 1978
| 
|-
| 7
| I
| 1979
| 
|-
| 81
| I & C
| 1979
| 
|-
| 128 ± 35
| I
| 1980
| 
|-
| −5.4 ± 25
| I
| 1980
| 
|-
| 200
| I
| 1980
| 
|-
| 230
| I
| 1980
| 
|-
| 180
| C
| 1981
| 
|-
| 289
| I*
| 1982
| 
|-
| 220 ± 40
| I
| 1983
| 
|-
| 85
| C
| 1984
| 
|-
| 0
| C
| 1984
| 
|-
| −22
| C
| 1985
| 
|-
| > 50
| I**
| 1986
| 
|-
| 230 ± 40
| I
| 1987
| 
|-
| 90 ± 2
| Absorption
| 1989
| 
|-
| 98 +30−40
| I & C
| 1990
| 
|-
| 118 ± 40
| I
| 1992
| 
|}

I: measurement derived from the value of the intensity ratios of the XeCl emissions centered at 308 and 345 nm (see § 3-1-1)

C: measurement derived from a kinetic study providing the coupling constants between these two states.

*: Emission at 345 nm is not corrected for the contribution XeCl (B → A)

**: XeCl is in the solid state.

Positioning of state B in relation to state C is theoretically justified by considering the configuration interaction between the ionic and covalent character states of similar symmetry. In a state 2Σ (as states B and X), a simply occupied orbital is located closer to an orbital of another atom such that the interaction or exchange of charges between two atoms are larger and easier than in a state 2π (like states C and A3/2), where a simply occupied orbital is perpendicular to the molecular axis and far away from another atom. The correction introduced by this phenomenon in terms of energy values is much more important for Σ states than for the π states. This interaction greatly increases the energy of state B relative to that of state C. Hence, the positioning on the observed potential curves from Figure 2.

The X and A states 

The lowest states are correlated with ground state xenon and chlorine atoms.

However, the effect of the spin-orbital coupling here is significantly weaker than in the case of  ion. At large internuclear distances, an energy gap of 882 cm−1 between A1/2 and A3/2 was experimentally measured in the solid state in a neon matrix. Thus, this value is very close to the energy separation of states Cl and Cl. This confirms the theoretical assumptions of state correlations between XeCl state A and Cl.
Unlike some other noble gas halides, XeCl has a non-dissociative ground state. This bonding character was demonstrated experimentally well before theoretical studies of XeCl in solid state argon matrices at 20K and later in the gaseous state.

The Van der Waals force between atoms is not strong enough in state X to explain the presence of a potential well that when low (the depth is in the order of kilotorr) can contain between 12 and 20 vibrational levels (see Table 3). The relative increase in the binding energy of state X compared to state A can also be explained by taking into account the configuration interaction. State A is also very lightly bound with binding energy half that of state X.

{| class="wikitable" style="text-align:center"
|+ Table 3 Experimental numbers of vibrational levels in the potential wells of state X.
! Value
! Reference
|-
| 15
| 
|-
| 20
| 
|-
| 12
| 
|-
| 18 ± 1
| 
|}

Spectroscopic constants 

The energy Ev'j'M of a known state M with a vibrational level v' with the rotational quantum number j is:

Ev'j'M = Te(M) + EVib(M) + ERot(M) where Te(M), EVib(M) and ERot(M) respectively denote the molecule's vibrational and rotational electronic energies.

Electronic structure 

The main features of the electronic states of a known state M are usually the dissociation energy De, the inter-atomic distance re and energy of the bottom of the potential well EM. For XeCl, different reported values of these quantities are summarized in Tables 4, 5 and 6. They were determined theoretically or experimentally for isotope  in the solid or gaseous state.

{| class="wikitable" style="text-align:center"
|+ Table 4. Dissociation energies De in cm−1.
! Ref
! X
! A
! B
! C
! D
|-
| 
| 280 ± 7%
| 129 ± 7%
|
|
|
|-
| 
|
|
| 
| 
| 
|-
| 
|
|
|
| 
|
|-
| 
| 281 ± 10
|
| 
|
| 
|-
| 
| 255 ± 10
|
| 
|
|
|-
| 
| 281.1 ± 0.7
|
|
|
|
|-
| 
|
| 154
|
|
|
|-
| 
|
| 161
|
|
|
|-
| 
| 225
|
|
|
|
|-
| 
|
|
| 
|
|
|}

Dissociation energies 

Dissociation energies have been calculated or measured for different states of the eximer. Some states have more measurements than others.  States A, C and D have too few measurements for a statistical analysis. For state B, the four values are not consistent with each other

For state X, there are six values, two of which are outliers. That of Flannery is an old, imprecise theoretical estimate. That of Tellinghuisen et al. is the first experimental determination made in 1976. Seven years later the same team corrected this value and closed the gap on the most recent estimates. The remaining four values seem to be the only reliable ones. De is (with a probability of 95%) between 278.3 cm−1 and 285.3 cm−1. The interval corresponds to a 1.3% fluctuation around 281.5 cm. Indeed, among the selected determinations are two measures with high uncertainty, and a third which the author does not indicate. The value of De of state X, depends on the number of vibrational levels contained in the well and sets the number of transitions bound → bound that can be achieved. This result is fundamental to a better understanding of XeCl laser spectroscopy.

Equilibrium atomic distances 

{| class="wikitable" style="text-align:center"
|+ Table 5: Equilibrium Inter-atomic Distances re in Ǻ.
!Ref
! X
! A
! B
! C
! D
|-
| 
| 3.44
|
|
|
|
|-
| 
| 3.23
| 4.1
|
|
|
|-
| 
|
|
| 3.22
| 3.14
| 3.18
|-
| 
|
|
| 3.227
|
|
|-
| 
|
|
|
| 3.14
|
|-
| 
| 3.23
|
| 3.007
|
| 2.922
|-
| 
| 3.18
|
| 2.9374
|
|
|-
| 
|
|
|
| 3.074
|
|-
| 
|
| 4.05
|
|
|
|-
| 
| 3.23
| 4.09
|
|
|
|-
| 
|
|
| 2.9
|
|
|-
| 
|
|
| 3.17
| 3.08
| 3.12
|}

The interatomic distance for states A, C and D has few measurements, but they are close. On average, state A is 0.408 nm, state D, 0.307 nm and state C, 0.311 nm.

For the state X, the theoretical determination of Adrian and Jette is statistically far from the others. Omitting it, using confidence level of 95% state X re, will be in the range: 0.318 nm < r  < 0.326 nm.

The value of Tellinghuisen et al. is at the limit of the interval. If ignored, the other three authors announce an identical value of 0.323 nm.

Tellinghuisen's value for state B is far from others for re. It is the same for Ewing et Brau, the oldest study of the noble gas halides which is based on the analogy of the excited rare gas with alkali metals. These are only estimates. These two values will be discarded to give a confidence interval at 95% for the interatomic distance of state B: 0.2993 nm < re < 0.3319 nm.

Bottom of the potential well energies 

{| class="wikitable" style="text-align:center"
|+ Table 6: Bottom of the potential well energies Ei in cm−1.
! Ref
! X
! A
! B
! C
! D
|-
| 
|
|
| 
| 
| 
|-
| 
|
|
|  ± 1
|  ± 1
|
|-
| 
|
|
|
| 29570
|
|-
| 
| 0
|
| 32405.8
|
|
|-
| 
|
|
|
| 
|
|-
| 
| 22.7
| 29.4
|
|
|
|-
| 
|
|
| 
|
|
|-
| 
|
|
| 
|
|
|-
| 
|
|
| 
|
|
|}

Table 6 shows that there is very little information for states X, A and D. For state X, Sur et al. arbitrarily took bottom of the well X as the origin of their energy scale. It is therefore not a direct measurement. Therefore, the state X as well as state A have been the subject of only one study; that of Aquilanti et al.. For state D, two quite different determinations exist.

As was seen in an earlier section, the location of states B and C is problematic.

State B has the most attention from researchers. Two measures are statistically far from the others. Besides the previously mentioned study by Ewing and Brau, the old theoretical work of Hay and Dunning are among the doubtful determinations which will be broached soon. Without considering these values, the experimental work provides a confidence interval at a very narrow 95% threshold: from 32380.1 cm−1 to 32415.3 cm−1.

In contrast, no conclusion can be drawn statistically given the small number of measurements of state C. However, further analysis will illuminate despite the non-matching character values in Table 6. Indeed, the positioning of the C states with respect to state B has resulted in many publications.

A statistical analysis of the values of Table 2 provides a step by step approach to the confidence interval at 95% which is the following: 76.8 cm−1 < (EB - EC) < 100.2 cm−1. Only four measures belong to this interval. This is the direct determination of Jouvet et al. and three values deduced from kinetic studies. On the other hand, a point estimate gives 88.5 cm−1 and the only measure to be consistent with it (given the absolute error indicated) is from Jouvet et al.. at (90 ± 2 cm−1). Statistical study then confirms the conclusions reached in paragraph 1.1.

The confidence intervals listed above for state B and the energy difference (EB – EC) produce an interval for EC: 32279.9 cm−1 < EC < 32338.4 cm−1.

Under these conditions, only the value of Jouvet et al. in Table 6 is consistent with this range. The three doubtful determinations include that of Hay and Dunning with a defective value for EB. Another early theoretical study by Clugston and Gordon also resulted in this interval. The same is true for solid state experimental work carried out by Fajardo and Apkarian.

Calculating the mean of the two values in Table 6 yields 43838.45 cm -1. The energy gap of state B is then of the order of 11400 cm−1. Shostak and Strong experimentally determined the energy difference between states A and B. They found 9900 cm−1. The difference between these values (EB – ED) is very sharp. Considering only work by Sur et al., the energy difference between states B and D becomes of the order of 9950 cm−1 which is close to that of Shostak and Strong. This observation casts fresh doubts on the theoretical work of Hay and Dunning for which (EB – ED) is 10888 cm−1.

With respect to the electronic structure, it appears that older studies pose a problem regarding some of their results. On the other hand, work carried out by Fajardo and Apkarian is not always consistent with observations of the gaseous state. Moreover, recent theoretical studies do not eliminate significant differences with experimental results.

The removal of the values of Hay and Dunning, reduces to a determination the values of De for states C and D, and makes the three other values relating to state B homogenous. Among these Tellinghuisen et al. poses a problem for other values. The energy De for state B then has an average value of 36184 cm−1.

Vibrational Structure 

The vibrational energy of level v’ of any state M can be calculated as:

EVib(M) = ωe (v’+1/2) –  (v’+1/2)2

where ωe and  indicates respectively, the basic vibrational frequency and the anharmonicity constant. Their respective determinations are collected in Tables 7 and table 8.

The basic vibrational frequencies 

The values of ωe are grouped together in Table 7.

{| class="wikitable" style="text-align:center"
|+ Table 7: Values of ωe in cm−1.
! Ref
! X
! B
! C
! D
|-
| 
|
| 210
|
|
|-
| 
|
| 188
| 188
| 189
|-
| 
| 27 ± 1
| 193 ± 1
| 204 ± 1
|
|-
| 
|
| 194.235
|
|
|-
| 
| 26.22
| 194.75
|
| 204.34
|-
| 
| 26.27 (± 0.55)
| 195.17 (± 0.31)
|
|
|-
| 
|
| 195.6
|
|
|-
| 
| 50 ± 10
|
|
|
|-
| 
|
|
| 188
|
|-
| 
|
| 195.2
|
|
|-
| 
|
|
| 187
|
|-
| 
|
|
|
| 210
|-
| 
|
| 195
|
| 198
|-
| 
|
| 205 ± 12
|
|
|}

States X, C and D have only four determinations. No measure can be considered statistically distant from others, despite disparities.

State B offers nine determinations. A statistical analysis leads to a confidence interval of 95%: 194.7 cm−1 < ωe < 195.4 cm−1.

Six values in Table 7 are strange. Three of them markedly so. They are old publications of which two (Hay and Dunning and Brau and Ewing) were central to the previous section. Golde's results were based on the same method as that used by Brau and Ewing.

The other three measures that are outside the range are more recent. Kvaran et al. researched the solid state. Like Fajardo and Apkarian, they observed significant differences in the gaseous state. In contrast, most surprising are disagreements between Jouvet et al. and Tamagake et al. which were studies with good results. Finally, among the values that agreed with these ranges are many studies that were more theoretical than experimental.

In conclusion, Tellinghuisen et al. gives very good results on both state B and state X.

The reported results on state C are rather questionable. The work by Jouvet et al. is at the extreme compared to other State B measures.

As for state D, excluding results by Hay and Dunning makes it more cohesive than the other three values.

Finally it is necessary to specify the values of ωe for states X, C and D. The main interest of this clarification would be a better resolution of the vibrational structure of the transition used in the laser, which requires a better knowledge of state X. On the other hand, the structure of state C is important because it plays a fundamental role in laser kinetics .

Anharmonicity constants 

Table 8 shows anharmonicity constant measurements for the various states. The measurements for constants of anharmonicity for states X, C and D are very inconsistent.

{| class="wikitable" style="text-align:center"
! Ref
! X
! B
! C
! D
|-
| 
|
| 0.66
| 0.85
| 0.80
|-
| 
|
| 0.25 ± 0.07
| 0.75 ± 0.1
|
|-
| 
|
| 0.63152
|
|
|-
| 
| – 0.321
| 0.627
|
| 0.682
|-
| 
| – 0.278 (± 0.17)
| 0.543 (± 0.063)
|
|
|-
| 
|
| 0.54
|
|
|}

Six measurements for state B produce the confidence interval at 95%:

0.532 cm−1 <  < 0.669 cm−1.

The work by Jouvet et al. is statistically far from the others and the authors cannot explain this difference. Hay and Dunning give correct forecasts, as does the vibrational structure study by Tellinghuisen et al..

Rotational structure 

The following expression denotes rotational energy: Erot(M) = B’.K’ef – D’.(K’ef)2, where K’ef = j’(j’+1) ± (1/2).δ(j’+1/2) ;

B’ and D’ respectively are the rotational constant and the first centrifugal distortion constant. Their values are indicated in table 9 and table 10. δ is a parameter that is equal to 2.0 for state B and 0.4 for state X.

{| class="wikitable" style="text-align:center"
|+ Table 9: Values of B’ in cm−1.
! Ref
! X (v'=0)
! X (v'=12)
! B
|-
| 
| 0.0585
|
| 0.0675
|-
| 
| 0.0560
| 0.0274
|
|-
| 
|
|
| 0.0669
|}

Therefore, the rotational structures is very poorly known. Despite that, one should notice the consistency of some measurements made on B’.

{| class="wikitable" style="text-align:center"
|+ Table 10: Values of D’ in cm−1.
! Ref
! X (v'=0)
! X (v'=12)
! B
|-
| 
| 9.3 × 10−7
| 1.9 × 10−6
|
|-
| 
|
|
| 3.2 × 10−8
|}

Synthetic pathways 

When they are in a configuration belonging to metastable states np5(n+1)s1, (n = 5 for xenon), rare gases possess properties of polarizability and elastic scattering similar to those of alkali metals. The valence electron, s, of the excited rare gas has a bond energy close to that of the alkali metal that follows it in the periodic table. In older publications, this analogy that is applicable only for the heavier rare gases, is used to study the behavior of these gases with halogen donors. The alkali metals have good chemical affinity for halogens and should have affinity for excited rare gases. Experimentally the collision cross section of metastable states of rare gases with the halogens is similar to that of alkali metals with halogens. Thus, an excited xenon has an electronic structure close to that of caesium, so that it can react with a chlorine donor in order to form .

Significant differences between alkali metals and excited rare gases exist in their molecular symmetry. The number of states of rare gas halides is greater than that of alkali metal salts. This is due to spin-orbital splitting of atoms and ions of rare gases.

The first condition to produce XeCl is to make xenon reactive. To do this, it must be either excited, ionized or both. Several methods of external excitation have been used. The most common are electric shocks, electron beams, laser excitation, microwaves and α particles.

The excitation is not selective and formation of  may follow many paths. Their relative importance varies with the conditions, especially with pressure, mode of excitation and the halogen donor. When ternary mixtures are involved, the creation process of XeCl is more complicated. Nevertheless, the addition of a buffer gas offers many advantages. Other rare gases are cheaper than xenon, but they (along with their excited species and their ions) absorb less than xenon at 308 nm. Thus, the buffer gas can be used in very high proportions without much alteration of the laser's output power. Under these conditions, the proportions of xenon and HCl must match those required to produce the desired amount of exciplex molecule. The essential role of the buffer gas is to transfer to xenon atoms the necessary excitation energy. This transfer can be regarded as instantaneous. It can result in excitation or ionization of xenon or the formation of a Rg ion. Each of these species may then react with the chlorine donor to form . On the other hand, the formation of neutral species of RgXe does not seem to be important.

The two main ways of exciplex synthesis are collision (between chlorine molecules and xenon, where at least one species is excited) and ion recombination. The buffer gas is sometimes a partner in the former and almost always involved in the latter.

Photoassociative pathway 

 synthesis occurs when a mixture containing xenon and chlorine is excited by means of a laser emitting between 304 nm and 312 nm. Two reactions are then induced:

 excitation of an electronically isolated atom or molecule of xenon followed by reactive collisions
 simultaneous interaction of a pair in a collision and one or two laser-introduced photons generates an intermediate state that then results in the desired product without an intervening collision.

In the latter case, a transient complex is formed (Xe-)* in the state (1Πu). Therefore, two dissociation pathways are possible from the time a photon is absorbed by the Cl-Cl pair or the pair Xe-Cl from * in the state (1Πu).

(1Πu) + hν → (1Πg) → − → XeCl(B,C) + Cl

Xe-(1Πu) + hν → Xe-Cl(X)-Cl + hν → Xe-Cl(B)-Cl → XeCl(B) + Cl

The rate constant of the reaction was measured by considering the photon as a third partner. It is 6 cm6s−1.

In all cases, the molecules of XeCl(B, C) are always produced in states with a strong vibrational excitation.

Collision pathway 

Numerous processes' importance rests on the type and excitation of the species in collision. The principal leftover in all cases is the emissions that follow from binary collisions.

Harpoon collisions 

These reactions involve the chlorine donor at the ground state and an excited atom of xenon, both in the first 6s, Xe * and at higher levels Xe ** such as level 6p.

Mechanism 

Generally, these reactions can describe the result of collisions of the noble gas atoms (Rg) and halogen donors (RX), where X is a halogen atom and R a radical molecule. The products of the reactions depend strongly on the type of rare gas and halogen donor. In our case where Rg = Xe and X = Cl, the nature of the products follows this rule. In some cases, this collision may not provide any halide rare gas.

The atom Rg and the molecule RX follow when they approach the lowest adiabatic potential and the reaction proceeds by the orbital mechanism controlled at the crossover of the ionic-covalent. The reagents (Rg and RX) approach on a covalent diabatic surface. They then form a complex ...RX at a fairly large internuclear distance. Its potential is V(Rg, RX). When the distance becomes sufficiently small, it may be that V(Rg, RX) intersects an ionic potential surface (...RX−). The crossover can occur through the transfer of an electron from Rg to RX. This is known as a harpoon mechanism. In this case, the atoms continue on the new surface. This leads to a diffusion reaction and the formation of RgX*.

Figure 3 shows the process of creating  which involves Rg=Xe and X=Cl. After its transfer, the electron occupies an antibonding orbital of RCl. In total, everything takes place according to the reaction equation:

Xe* + RCl → (B,C,D) + R with rate constant of kMX

However, the competitive formation of  reactions occur before or after the intersection. They correspond to the interactions of the V potential (RX*) and V (Rg + RX *).

In general, this situation occurs when the ionic surface is intersected by covalent surfaces where RX is in its lowest excited state. The distribution of output depends on the number and nature of output channels that are possible following collisions. The most common occurs at the intersection of the potential surfaces by a transfer of electronic energy that can cause a dissociation of the excited acceptor:

 + RX → (Rg+...RX−) → Rg(B,C,D) + RX* with rate constant kET

 + RX → (Rg+...RX−) → Rg + R + X with rate constant kD

This pathway tends to become less important as the complexity of RX increases

It is also possible that the transfer took place in a state that is not correlated to the RX* ion but at very high Rydberg states in the neutral molecule and lying just below the limits of ionization. Critical factors regulating the branching ratios are the potential energies interrelated with the molecular ion (VI), the Rydberg group close to the ionization (VII) or an initial excited atom (VIII). The importance of these pathways increases with the depth of hole V (RX*).

When the highly separated asymptotic energy levels are in the order VI > VII > VIII and the potential energies (VII) are attractive, the first failed intersection is encountered when the approach of reacting atoms favors output of (VII) rather than the anionic (VI). Since (VII) has a cationic center that remains strongly linked, it preferentially leads to a transfer of excitation. This is the dissociative excitation reaction:

 + RX → Rg + R* + X or Rg + R + X* with rate constant kDE

If VIII > VII at long distance, the Penning ionization pathway or associative ionization are possible:

Penning ionization :  + RX → Rg + RX+ + e− with rate constant kPI

Associative ionization:  + RX → (RgRX)+ + e− with rate constant kAI

In (VI) bonding with an halogen atom is in principle, weak and atomic transfer is enhanced between Rg and R. This potential thus leads to the formation of the exciplex.

There are therefore a priori five competitive ways of synthesizing RGX. For  an excited xenon atom collides with a chlorine donor. These five reactions were all observed for various chlorine donors. To quantify the proportion of produced exciplex, it is customary to define the branching ratio. It shows the rate of formation of XeCl, as denoted by Γ XeCl:

ΓXeCl = kMX / (kMX + kAI + kPI + kET + kDE + kD)

ΓXeCl measurements were effectuated for several chlorine donors and principally for the 6s and 6p states of xenon.

Xe(6s or 6p) + RCl → products with rate constant kQ

kQ is the total rate constant and is calculated as: kQ = kMX + kAI + kPI + kET + kDE + kD

{| class="wikitable" style="text-align:center"
|+ Table 11.
! State of xenon
! kQ × 10−10
! Reference
|-
|  or (6s[3/2]2)
| (10 ± 2)
| 
|-
|  or (6s[3/2]2)
| 7.2
| 
|-
|  or (6s[3/2]2)
| (7.0 ± 0.5)
| 
|-
| 
| (7.9 ± 0.9)
| 
|-
| 1P1
| (7.6 ± 0.7)
| 
|-
| (6p[1/2]0)
| (14.6 ± 0.2)
| 
|-
| (6p[1/2]0)
| (17.9 ± 0.2)
| 
|-
| (6p[1/2]2)
| (14.5 ± 0.2)
| 
|-
| (6p[1/2]2)
| (15.5 ± 0.2)
| 
|-
| (6p[5/2]2)
| (13.3 ± 1.0)
| 
|-
| (6p[5/2]2)
| (12.8 ± 0.3)
| 
|-
| (6p'[3/2]2)
| (18.6 ± 0.5)
| 
|-
| (6p'[1/2]0)
| (21.9 ± 1.0)
| 
|-
| (7p[5/2]2)
| (30.7 ± 1.9)
| 
|-
| (7p[1/2]0)
| (29.5 ± 0.8)
| 
|-
| (7d[1/2]1)
| (9.2 ± 0.5)
| 
|}

This decision is justified by the fact that for Xe* +  we have VII > VI > VIII, which according to Simons fixes an unlikely channel for the excitation transfer.

{| class="wikitable" style="text-align:center"
|+ Table 12 : Total rate constants in cm3s−1 and ΓXeCl for the harpoon collisions between Xe* and HCl (v = 0).
! State of xenon
! kQ × 10−10
! ΓXeCl
! Reference
|-
|  or (6s[3/2]1)
| 6.2
| 0.01
| 
|-
|  or (6s[3/2]2)
| (7 ± 2)
|
| 
|-
|  or (6s[3/2]2)
| 5.6
| 0.01
|  and Velazco et al.
|-
|  or (6s[3/2]2)
| 5.6
| <0.02
| 
|-
| 1P1
| 4.62
|
| Chen and Setser
|-
| 1P1
| 7
| ≈0
| 
|-
| (6p[1/2]0)
| (8.3 ± 0.5)
| 0.80 ± 0.15
| 
|-
| (6p[3/2]2)
| (8.0 ± 0.5)
| 0.60 ± 0.15
| 
|-
| (6p[3/2]2)
| (6.5 ± 0.2)
|
| 
|-
| (6p[5/2]2)
| (8.0 ± 0.5)
| 0.40 ± 0.15
| 
|-
| 5d[3/2]
| (15.6 ± 1.5)
| 0.48
| 
|-
| Summary of 6p states
| 5
|
| 
|-
| Summary of 6p states
| 5.6
| 0.60
| 
|}

A first analysis of Tables 11-13 shows that the results are in good agreement when several measurements were made for the same reaction. We find that most collisions had their rate constants measured only once. Moreover, with rare exceptions, these determinations for KQ and ΓXeCl are limited to the lowest excited states of atomic xenon. This shows the need for new measures to confirm the available experimental results and estimate the role of other states that do not fail to form if one makes use of, as for the lasers, non-selective modes of excitation.

{| class="wikitable" style="text-align:center"
! State of xenon
! kQ × 10−10
! ΓXeCl
! Reference
|-
|  and 
| 1.73
| 0.24
| 
|-
|  and 
| 6.3
| 0.13
| 
|-
| (6p[1/2]0)
| (7.5 ± 0.2)
| 0.68 ± 0.2
| 
|-
| (6p[3/2]2)
| (7.8 ± 0.5)
| 0 60 ± 0.15
| 
|-
| (6p[5/2]2)
| (7.3 ± 0.5)
| 0.35 ± 0.10
| 
|}

An important result for XeCl lasers is evident in an initial analysis. Xe(6s) + HCl (v = 0) does not produce XeCl. However, according to the estimates of Kannari et al. 5% of exciplex synthesis occurs through the harpoon reaction. In addition, Xe(6p) states produce 2.5% of this amount.

Initial States: Xe(6s) 

Molecular chlorine reacts efficiently with these xenon states. Since  is formed in gaseous mixtures (Figure 1), this reaction is important in the kinetics of XeCl lasers.

This reaction is important in the kinetics of  lasers.

If the chlorine donor is HCl, the situation is more complex. Two situations are apparent:

 HCl at the ground state with vibrational level v=0. The values for KD are very similar regardless of the initial state of xenon; the branching ratio for the 6s states is very low. In addition, competitive reactions occur before the intersection of the potential curves V(Xe* + HCl) and V( + H). The quenching Xe (6s) HCl is important in laser kinetics. It destroys xenon states capable of forming an exciplex.
 HCl in the ground state with vibrational level v=1. For the Xe() state, Chang identified a marked increase in the XeCl production rate. The rate constant for XeCl synthesis was measured with a minimum value of 2 cm3s−1 and ΓXeCl = 35%. The first estimate made by Levin et al. and based on correspondence was published at 6 cm3s−1 and ΓXeCl = 11%, but this reaction was obsoleted by Chang's direct measurements. As the vibrational excitation of HCl increases, the rate of formation of XeCl follows. No direct measure is available, but analogical estimates exist. For v=2, values for synthesis rate constants include: 5.6 cm3s−1 and 2.0 cm3s−1.

According to other authors, the set of vibrational levels are taken into account. And for V ≥ 1, Kannari et al. proposed a synthesis rate constant of 5.6 cm3s−1 and ΓXeCl = 26%. Experiments are necessary to clarify this aspect of laser kinetics.

Initial States: Xe(6p) 

The synthetic reactions of XeCl are generally more effective than the 6s state. This applies for the three chlorine donors indicated graphically in tables 11, 12, and 13.

For HCl, the situation is different from the previous case. If the total rate constants are of the same order of magnitude as those of the 6s states, the branching ratios ΓXeCl are high.

With reference to the potential curves of Figure 3, the potential curves of V( + RX) and V( + RX−) intersect at a greater internuclear distance than 6s states in a region of strong interactions.

Competitive reactions occur. One of them has been experimentally observed and quantified – the collisional relaxation induced by HCl:

Xe(6p[3/2]2) + HCl → Xe(6s[5/2]20) + HCl with rate constant ka or ka = 4.3 cm3s−1.

This represents only 6% of the value of kQ from table 12 for the (6p[3/2]2) state. As the proportions of exciplex synthesis is placed at 60%, one should conclude that there are other important competitive processes at play.

The summarized results in Table 12 relate to HCl (v=0). For 6p states, the role of vibrational excitation of HCl in the kinetics of XeCl formation is poorly understood. Some authors argue for rate constants neighboring state v=0 if HCl is vibrationally excited, but this results are based on analogies. An experimental clarification is therefore needed. The rate constant for v=1 is placed at 5.6 cm3s−1. The same value is used for v=2. Kannari et al. is still not likely to reduce the different vibrational levels of HCl and for v≥1, 8.2 cm3s−1 is proposed.

Strongly excited states of xenon 

Experiments conducted with  show that the effectiveness of XeCl formation increases with the excitation energy of the xenon atom; the rate constant of synthesis is multiplied by three when one goes beyond the 6s states to the 7p states (table 11).

The rate of  synthesis increases by an order of magnitude when one goes beyond the 6s states to the 6p states when  (table 13) is utilized.

HCL is ambiguous. An examination of Table 12 shows that the increase in kQ does not appear to increase significantly with the xenon excitation. So far, no measurements go beyond the 5d[3/2] state that is roughly of the same energy as the 6p state. The rate of synthesis also seems very effective from the 7s[3/2] states without there being any known numerical value. The available information does not support assuming a more efficient rate of synthesis of the exciplex as the excitation of xenon gradually increases. Indeed, for the state 5d[5/2]30, there is only an excitation with a reaction rate constant of 3.2 cm3s−1:

Xe(5d[5/2]20) + HCl → Xe(6p[3/2]2) + HCl

Also, the Rydberg states do not appear to have produced XeCl. The observed reactions for Xe(31f) are the following:

Xe(31f) + HCl(J) → Xe(31l) + HCl(J) (α)

Xe(31f) + HCl(J) → Xe(nl) + HCl(J-1) if J≤5 (β)

Xe(31f) + HCl(J) →  + e− + HCl(J-1) if J>5 (γ)

The total rate constant is kT = (11.3 ± 3.0) cm3s−1, divided into the following:

kα = (5.5 ± 2.5) cm3s−1 (l-changing)

kβ = (4.8 ± 2.4) cm3s−1 (n-changing)

kγ = (0.9 ± 0.4) cm3s−1 (ionisation)

Note that the reaction (γ) produces an important XeCl precursor, namely .

Conclusions 

Harpoon reactions play an important role in laser kinetics.

For the XeCl laser, the harpooning kinetics is more complex. Despite its weak proportion in a gaseous mixture,  is produced much effectively from the exciplex through harpooning.

The kinetics of the vibrational excitation of HCl is therefore fundamental. At least the first six levels of vibration should be taken into consideration in order to build a satisfactory model. This vibrational excitation is produced by the following electrons:

HCl(v) + e− → HCl(v’) + e− (EV) with rate constant K.

The rate constants of (EV) were measured for the following transitions: v=0→v’=1, v=0→v’=2, v=1→ v’=2 et v=2→v’=3. An empirical law can then be proposed:

Kv→v+1 = v K0→1

Kv→v+2 = v K0→2

The values for K are dependent on the electron energy distribution as shown in Figure 4.

In the harpoon reactions, the rate of synthesis of the B state with respect to that of the C state is included between 1 and 2 whatever the nature of the rare gas halide. Nevertheless, one notices a clear increase in the proportion of state B with respect to state C when pressure increases. This relation is also strongly influenced by the nature of the chlorine donor. The excitation state of xenon is important.

Other reactions are involved in the reactive collisions between neutral species but they play a negligible role.

Reactions involving excited molecular species

The role of xenon molecules 

It is difficult to find reactions involving the molecules of xenon and HCL in published literature.

Lorents only measured the rate constant of decomposition of Xe2* by HCl as (8.2 ± 0.8) cm3s−1 without stating the resulting products.

In contrast, Bibinov et Vinogradov observed the following reaction with :

Xe2* +  →  + Cl + Xe

Exciplex synthesis was by harpooning. The rate constant was estimated at 7.1 cm3s−1.

The role of excited HCl 

Castillejo et al. observed an HCl emission between 200 and 240 nm due to the B transition B(1Σ+) → X (1Σ+) (see figure 5). This emission disappears with increase in the pressure of xenon and XeCl(B) appears. In other words, XeCl(B) could be synthesized by the reaction:

HCl (B 1Σ+) + Xe (1SO) → XeCl(B) + H

The rate constant is estimated at 5 cm3s−1.

Another output pathway seems competitive to exciplex synthesis within the same collision which product should be:

 + H + Cl + e− and the associated rate constant associated is 1 cm3s−1.

The role of excited  

 is synthesized in the laser through the following reaction:

Cl* + HCl → * + Cl

The rate constant is 1 cm3s−1. Exciplex synthesis occurs through the following reaction:

Xe + *(1Σu+) → + Cl with rate constant ku

The values of ku are given in table 14. The results from Zuev et al. is statistically distant from the others although recent. Ignoring it, the average value should be ku = 2.6 cm3s−1.

{| class="wikitable" style="text-align:center"
|+ Table 14 : Values of ku in cm3s−1
! ku × 10−10
! Reference
|-
| 1.1
| 
|-
| (1.2 ± 0.2)
| 
|-
| (3.0 ± 0.5)
| 
|-
| 18
| 
|-
| 5
| 
|}

A corresponding reaction could be found for the * (D’ 3π2g) state.

Termolecular reactions 

They are essentially produced in ternary mixtures and are of the type:

 +  + M →  + Cl + M with rate constant kc

The rate constant kc is given in table 15. Notice only the processes where M=Ar are negligible.

{| class="wikitable" style="text-align:center"
|+ Table 15 : Values of kc in cm6s−1.
! State of xenon 
! M = Xe × 10−28
! M = Ar × 10−28
|-
| (6p[1/2]0)
| (3.5 ± 0.5)
| < 0.5
|-
| (6p[3/2]2)
| (1.4 ± 0.5)
| < 0.1
|-
| (6p[5/2]2)
| (1.8 ± 0.5)
| < 0.1
|}

As for helium, there are two reactions:

Xe* + Cl + He →  + He

 + Cl + He →  + He

The rate constants are respectively, 10−27 cm6s−1 and 3 cm6s−1.

There also exist data where the xenon atoms are at the ground state:

Xe + Cl + M → XeCl (X) + M where M = Ne or Xe

In both cases, the rate constant is: 1.2 cm6s−1.

Other reactions 

Chlorine, synthesized in a gaseous mixture could induce the following reactions:

Xe +  → 

Xe* +  + Xe →  + − + Xe →* + Xe

This causes a parasitic lasing phenomenon called "laser snow".

Some authors have proposed increasing the temperature to make  sublime. It then becomes reactive and actively participates in the synthesis of  :

* →  + Cl

Xe* +  → 2 

The temperature increase procures two advantages: to eliminate the parasitic laser phenomenon and increase XrCl production. However, the increase should not be of much importance so that  does not dissociate which would destroy the preceding reaction.

In ternary mixtures, RgCl exciplexes could be synthesized, possibly leading to the formation of  through so-called displacement reactions. They have been observed when the Rg is Ar or Kr:

RgCl* + Xe →  + Rg with rate constant kd or kd=1.5 cm3s−1 for Rg = Ar

Inversely, RgCl synthesis consumes the available chlorine reducing the rate of XeCl production. The laser quality may be negatively affected as was the case with krypton.

A second pathway exists and will be considered.

Ion recombination 

According to several authors bimolecular reactions ( + ,  +  and Rg + ) are not involved.

Ternary reactions are typically:

 +  + Rg →  + Rg (3)

 +  + Rg →  + Rg + Xe (4)

 +  + Rg →  + 2 Rg (5)

Xenon ions are synthesized directly in the discharge or through successive reactions that involve Rg+, Rg2+ as well as other ionic or excited species. Figure 1 gives an example where Rg=Ne and figure 6 where Rg=He.

The  ions are basically formed by dissociative attachment from an HCl electron:

HCl(v) + e− → H +  (AD)

In that same case, the rate constant (AD) depends on the energy distribution of the electrons as illustrated in Figure 4.

The third element Rg is passive chemically. It only serve to stabilize the reaction. Therefore, the authors only took the recombination rates of the positive and negative ions into consideration. These vary in a significant way with the total pressure of the gaseous mixture, the buffer gas and temperature.

Reactions (3) and (4) were experimentally demonstrated for all the rare gases. Figure 7 and Figure 8 show the influence of the buffer gas and pressure on the rate of recombination of these reactions when helium and then neon are utilized as buffer gases. This rate of recombination is of the same order of magnitude in both cases, of about some 10−6 cm3s−1. Apparently the influence of temperature has only been studied for neon. (See Figure 9.) The rate of recombination α3 in reaction (3) is at maximum at 180K for an absolute pressure of 294.2 kPa. α3 is therefore 4.2 cm3s−1.

The more refined analysis of reaction (4) was carried out by Bates et Morgan. who found that the Monte-Carlo method, Flannery's equation and Langevin's theory can give good results only when the pressure is above 1 atm. This is the norm for lasers. The proposed "tidal" theory agrees with the experimental measurements of Mezyk et al. which is evident in Figure 10. The rate of recombination α4 for reaction (4) is of the same order of magnitude as α3.

Reaction (5) is only observed when Rg is neon or argon. For this reaction, the evolution of the rate of recombination α5 in the presence of pressurized neon is shown in figure 6. Imada et al. studied the influence of temperature for a fixed total pressure of 294 kPa. The maximum value of α5 is obtained at 120K and α5 = 7.5 cm3s−1.

For argon only two estimations are available at room temperature. At a pressure of 2 atm, α5 = 2.10−6 cm3s−1 and at a pressure of 1 atm, α5 is 1 cm3s−1.

Reaction (5) does not favor a transitory complex Rg as an intermediate stage. The following reaction, therefore, plays a minor role:

Rg +  + Rg → Rg + Rg →  + 2 Rg

On the contrary, the principal synthetic pathway is given by:

Rg +  + Rg → 2 Rg +  +  →  + 2Rg

Kannari et al.. estimated the contribution of each of the three recombination and harpooning reactions for three types of mixtures. The results are shown in Table 16. Reaction (3) provides the bulk of the exciplex molecules and generally the harpooning reactions play a secondary role. When helium is used, in contrast, the harpooning reactions contributes about 10–15% of  synthesis. Other authors only estimate this contribution at 1% when the ionic pathway is involved. These theoretical conclusions are confirmed by experimental methods for the generality of the buffer gases and for other chlorine donors. The "harpoon" reactions, notwithstanding, are important despite their low contributions. These harpoon reactions are the reactions which are set in motion after the first excitation. Ionic recombinations, which then provide the bulk of the exciplex molecules, kick off 20 ns later.

{| class="wikitable" style="text-align:center"
! Reaction
! Xe/HCl
! Ar/Xe/HCl
! Ne/Xe/HCl
|-
|  + 
| 83.1%
| 81.5%
| 69.6%
|-
| Xe2+ + 
| 11.9
| 8.2
| 9.5
|-
| M + 
|
| 6.3
| 11.1
|-
|  + HCl
| 2.5
| 1.4
| 1.4
|-
| Xe* + HCl(v)
| 2.5
| 2.6
| 2.6
|-
| Others
|
|
| 5.8
|}

In table 16, the column named "others" shows 5.8% for neon, meaning that other recombination pathways are possible.

 ions are synthesized in the gaseous mixtures used in lasers. Nevertheless, this reaction is only a little contribution to the kinetics of the laser.

Alekhin et al. have also synthesized  using NaCl vapors.  is the product of the lowest vibrational states (v≤20) using highly excited Xe* ions in a bimolecular reaction. The rate of synthesis is estimated to be between 2 and 1 cm3s−1. A corresponding reaction is proposed using HCl. This conclusion is based on the presence of the states which are responsible for the third continuum of xenon – only  ions, since  is not produced. On the contrary, Xe* ion participation in the reaction is compatible with the observations of other authors. Several authors have confirmed the presence of Xe* ions (6s 4P3/2) in the laser mixtures. Their concentration is a thousand times greater than that of Xe* ions in the harpoon reaction. The distribution during harpoon reactions between states B and C occurs in random proportions in experimental conditions.

The first estimate of the ionic pathways was made by Tysone and Hoffman who suggested 76% for states B and 24% for states C. Successively, the buffer gases are neon, argon and krypton. Ohwa and Kushner published similar values: 77% for states B and 23% for states C. They used a quaternary mixture containing a buffer gas (using neon) from hydrogen, H2.

A recent and more detailed study was conducted by Tsuji et al. in a mixture of helium as buffer gas. They found that:

– States D are especially formed from  ion, (2P1/2) ;

– States B and C are exclusively produced from  ion (2P3/2) in the following proportions: States B – 62.6% and States C – 38.4%. There is then few competing reactions.

In laboratory experiments, the number of the (2P1/2) and (2P3/2) states are the same. In addition, the rate constants of reaction (3) relative to these two states of xenon are similar. However, under these conditions, the number of states D formed is very low with respect to the number of states B and C. The rate of XeCl(D) formation with respect to XeCl(B, C) is estimated at about 0.033±0.006. The faster dissociation of [(2P1/2)]* with respect to that of [(2P3/2)]* is responsible for this situation.

Pathways of decomposition

Radiation

Emission spectra 

The corresponding spectra demonstrated in Figure 11 was observed by virtually all authors who studied mixtures that were based on xenon and a chlorine donor.

Two theoretical studies have enabled identification of the emission spectra. Five transitions have heightened intensities that correspond to ΔΩ = 0 i.e., a parallel polarization to the internuclear axis. The starting states are always ionic and the product states are covalent. The characteristics of these emissions are as shown in Table 17.

{| class="wikitable" style="text-align:center"
|+ Table 17.  emissions.
! Transition
! Experiment
! Theory
! Theory
! Theory
|-
|
| Observed wavelength(nm)
| Computed wavelength of emission (nm)
| Time for transition (s)
| Probability of emission (s−1)x 107
|-
| B → X
| 308
| 295; 282
| 2.76; 2.85
| 9.3; 11.4
|-
| D → X
| 235.5
| 224; 216
| 1.94; 2.09
| 10; 14
|-
| C → A3/2
| 345
| 330; 306; 355
| 0.96; 0.98
| 0.81; 1.05
|-
| B → A1/2
| 345
| 324; 307
| 0.87; 0.88
| 0.6; 0.84
|-
| D → A1/2
| Non-observed
| 242; 233
| 0.50; 0.49
| 0.56; 0.59
|}

The most probable UV transitions are the B→X and D→X. They have the Σ→Σ type. The other transitions, B→A, C→A and D→A, have the nature Π→Π and are much less probable.

Other theoretically weaker transitions have not yet resulted in an observation with the exception of Hay and Dunning, who made provisions for four transitions that are perpendicularly polarized at the internuclear axis; in other words, with ΔΩ = ±1. Only Ewing and Brau noted an emission centered at 425 nm attributed to a 2Σ→2Π transition. Finally, Krauss suggested the possibility of an emission of the D→B type whose transition period is itself very weak. Table 6 places this at 931 nm.

The principal emissions were observed and reported as in Table 17.

The B→X line is observed at 308 nm (Figure 11) while the theoretical prediction of its existence was clearly weak. This is the narrowest emission and the final state shows a somewhat shallow potential well. Just like the rare gas halides, this emission has the strongest transition period. That is why it is the preferred emission in XeCl lasers.

Experimentally, the (C→A) and (B→A) lines overlap, producing a continuum centered at 345 nm, often of low amplitude as can be observed in Figure 11. The width of the emission depends on the transition tending to a strongly repulsive state. Koltz et al. placed this continuum at between 312 and 460 nm. The weak observed intensities are attributed to the weakness of the probabilities of the transition of the two emissions opposite that of the B→X and by the small amounts of states C formed with respect to states B as was previously seen. Other authors have called attention to the absorption phenomena of molecule  at this wavelength. According to Kannari et al., reaction (3) is the principal pathway for synthesis of states B and C. Tsuji et al. estimated the proportions of states B and C formed: 38% for state C and 62% state B. The value of the transition probabilities (theoretical value of IB→A/IB→X = 0.07; experimental value of 0.05), so the contribution of (B→A) emission is about 10%. Several authors claimed that a laser based on the 345 nm emission could be developed, especially at pressures of about 10 atmospheres when states B and C are thermalized. Meanwhile, no concrete result had been discovered as of 2014.

The (D→X) transition centered at 235.5 nm has not been systematically observed. The corresponding line appears weak as in the case in Figure 12. Its optical width is similar to that of (B→X) emission because it leads to the same weakly bound state of X. In contrast, the relative intensity of the (B→X) and (D→X) emissions considerably vary from one author to the other: ID→X/IB→X = 1/3 by Shuker, 1/25 to 1/50 by Sur et al. and 0.14 by Taylor et al.. The latter authors noted that the relation is pressure-independent. It remains unlikely that a laser could be developed using this transition as Shuker had predicted.

The spectra did not show any D→A emission. Nevertheless, Hassal et Ballik saw a line at 246 nm with very weak intensity (figure 12) without attributing it to the transition under consideration.

State D emissions are negligible for XeCl spectroscopy. Attributing the absence of D→A as for D→B to the weakly associated transition probability, the same cannot be said for D→X. From Table 17, the D→X emission should be of lesser intensity than B→X. In this case, the possible explanation could be due to the weak production of state D, either by the ionic pathway or by the harpoon reaction using states Xe(3P). The principal path of  synthesis is reaction (3) and the relation of the number of states B to that of state D is 0.053. From Table 17, it is likely that state D will de-excite exclusively towards state X. Table 17's transition probabilities show ID→X/IB→X≈6.2%, with results of the order of magnitude of Sur et al. and not far from that of Taylor et al..

These emissions are more or less degraded for short wavelengths as the emission spectrum of the (B→X) line shows in figure 13. A corresponding oscillation phenomenon with the same wavelength was observed in the absorption spectra. Besides, the (D→X) emission has the same line structure as (B→X).

The width and oscillatory nature of these lines are bound to the existence of transitions arising from high vibrational levels of excited radiative states. The vibrational excitation is a result of the energy left after exciplex molecule formation. This energy depends on both the state of the xenon atom/ion involved in the reaction and the halogen donor. For the 345 nm emission, the transitions at a high vibrational level are more dispersed towards the red region for C→A3/2 than for B→A1/2 because the repulsive barrier of A3/2 is steeper and closer to the higher state of the emission than is A1/2.

The oscillatory nature of these spectra tends to disappear with an increase of pressure, showing only the peaks arising from the v≤2 level when the pressure is above 1 atm. This shows that the vibrational relaxation effectively depopulates the highest vibrational levels. On the other hand, the disappearance of the elevated levels is faster for state B than for state C because state C has a much longer lifetime. The vibrational relaxation of states B and C play an important role in the chemical kinetics of XeCl lasers.

Beyond 5 atm, these lines increase in width, possibly due to collisional enlargement induced by rays or due to the entire rotational structure.

The isotopic effects are negligible for xenon but marked for chlorine. The vibrational lines associated with the heaviest isotope 37Cl are lightly displaced towards the greatest wavelengths. For example, the gap reads 1.51Å for the 4-0 line of B→X.

Radiative lifetimes of excited species 

Values for states B, C and D are shown in Table 18 for the vibrational level v=0. These are states B and C which have resulted in more determinations.

{| class="wikitable" style="text-align:center"
|+ Table 18. Lifetime (in ns) of  states.
! State B : τB
! State C : τC
! State D : τD
! Method
! Reference
|-
| 11.1 ± 0.2
| 130.5 ± 1.5
|
| Experimental (gas)
| 
|-
| 27 ± 3
| 53 ± 6
|
| Experimental (gas)
| 
|-
| 10.1
| 123
| 9.5
| Theoretical
| 
|-
| 11.1 ± 0.2
| 131 ± 10
|
| Experimental (gas)
| 
|-
|
| 135
|
| Experimental (gas)
| 
|-
| 8.2
| 95
| 6.9
| Theoretical
| 
|-
|
|
| 11
| Experimental (solid)
| 
|-
|
| 133.5 ± 4.5
|
| Experimental (solid)
| 
|-
|
| 120 ± 9
|
| Experimental (solid)
| 
|-
| 17
|
|
| Experimental (gas)
| 
|}

In state B, two values are statistically distant from the others. They correspond to the oldest measurements. Without taking them into account, the confidence interval obtained in ns is: 8<τB<12.3.

For state C, the dispersion is more important. Grieneisen et al.'s determination is still statistically distant from the others as well as the two theoretical values along with a measurement obtained at the solid state. When the above is disregarded, the confidence interval, in ns, then becomes: 129.1<τC<135.9.

Using average values, the relation τB/τC is 0.0764. It is adequately comparable with a direct measure which is 0.087 ± 0.009. This relation is important because it plays an important role in the vibrational relaxation of states B and C.

A systematic study of the lifetimes of several vibrational levels (v≤136) of states B and C was conducted as reported in Table 19.

{| class="wikitable" style="text-align:center"
|+ Table 19. Lifetime of vibrational levels of states B and C of XeCl.
! Vibrational level
! Energy (cm−1); State C
! Lifetime (ns) ; State C
! Energy (cm−1); State B
! Lifetime (ns) ; State B
|-
| 0
| 139.42
| 120.0
| 369.42
| 11.0
|-
| 4
| 876.08
| 127.6
| 1136.05
| 11.08
|-
| 8
| 1590.86
| 136.4
| 1882.33
| 11.88
|-
| 12
| 2284.25
| 137.2
| 2608.63
| 12.29
|-
| 16
| 2956.77
| 142.8
| 3315.38
| 12.64
|-
| 20
| 3608.94
| 146.9
| 4002.98
| 12.53
|-
| 24
| 4241.29
| 152.3
| 4671.84
| 12.35
|-
| 28
| 4854.33
| 174.1
| 5322.39
| 13.43
|-
| 32
| 5448.6
| 182.1
| 5955.05
| 14.10
|-
| 36
| 6024.61
| 195.3
| 6570.25
| 14.5
|-
| 40
| 6582.89
| 195.5
| 7168.42
| 14.84
|-
| 44
| 7123.96
| 210.3
| 7750.00
| 16.12
|-
| 48
| 7648.33
| 224.6
| 8315.41
| 16.38
|-
| 52
| 8156.52
| 230.6
| 8865.10
| 17.25
|-
| 56
| 8649.03
| 245.0
| 9399.49
| 18.69
|-
| 60
| 9126.35
| 256.4
| 9919.03
| 19.33
|-
| 64
| 9588.98
| 265.0
| 10424.17
| 20.15
|-
| 68
| 10037.4
| 275.2
| 10915.27
| 21.35
|-
| 72
| 10472.1
| 279.1
| 11392.77
| 22.42
|-
| 76
| 10883.4
| 270.2
| 11897.07
| 23.88
|-
| 80
| 11302.0
| 296.2
| 12308.67
| 24.78
|-
| 84
| 11698.1
| 298.2
| 12747.97
| 26.04
|-
| 88
| 12082.3
| 308.3
| 13175.27
| 27.52
|-
| 92
| 12454.9
| 318.1
| 13390.97
| 28.98
|-
| 96
| 12815.3
| 325.6
| 13994.47
| 30.21
|-
| 100
| 13167
| 337.7
| 14389.17
| 31.77
|-
| 104
| 13507.3
| 343.3
| 14772.37
| 33.21
|-
| 108
| 13837.6
| 349.1
| 15145.174
| 35.14
|-
| 112
| 14158.1
| 352.8
| 15508.67
| 37.16
|-
| 116
| 14469.3
| 357.9
| 15862.27
| 39.03
|-
| 120
| 14771.5
| 375.1
| 16206.67
| 40.91
|-
| 124
| 15065
| 398.5
| 16541.97
|
|-
| 128
| 15627.1
| 433.7
| 17186.47
|
|-
| 136
| 15896.2
| 438.5
| 17496.07
|
|}

Lifetimes increase by a factor of 4 when v goes from 0 to 100. A graphical extrapolation of the data relative to state B is shown in Figure 14.

For state D, only three determinations are relatively close to one another. At the gaseous state, Shuker noted that D→X emission has a time-based dependence similar to B→X emission, which is in line with the previous magnitudes as the lifetime of the B state is of the order of 10 ns. However, other measures are necessary to precisely value τD.

The collisional pathway 

The influences of xenon and HCl will be discussed first, followed by the role of the diverse buffer gases and of the chlorine donors.

Destruction of the  molecule

In Xe/HCl mixtures 

The only process of destruction of states B and C of XeCl, other than the radiative process, which has been proved is:

 + HCl → Other products and not XeCl (6) with rate constant of kH

 + Xe → Other products and not XeCl (7) with rate constant of kX

 + Xe + HCl → Other products and not XeCl (9) with rate constant of kM

 + e− → Xe + Cl + e− (10) with rate constant of ke

As of 2014 no result had been found for state D.

The values obtained for states B and C are collected in Table 20. The authors assume that the reaction rates are identical for the two states.

{| class="wikitable" style="text-align:center"
|+ Table 20: Rate constants for disappearance of XeCl(B, C) in cm3s−1 for ke, kH and kX and in cm6s−1 for kDX and kM.
! Ref
! kH
! kX
! kDX
! kM
! ke
|-
| 
| 1.4 × 10−9 (± 40%)
| 3.2 × 10−11 (± 35%)
|
|
|
|-
| 
| (6.3 ± 0.5) × 10−10
| (2.3 ± 0.3) × 10−11
|
|
|
|-
| 
|
|
|
|
| 4 × 10−8
|-
| 
|
| 0.4 × 10−11
| 1.3 × 10−30
|
|
|-
| 
| (7.3 ± 0.1) × 10−10
| < 4 × 10−12
| (1.53 ± 0.1) × 10−30
|
|
|-
| 
|
| (5.0+3.0−2.0) × 10−12
| (13.0 ± 4.0) × 10−31
|
|
|-
| 
|
|
| 7.3 × 10−31
|
|
|-
| 
|
|
|
|
| 1.16 × 10−7
|-
| 
| 1.7 × 10−9
|
| 4 × 10−31
|
| 1.2 × 10−7
|-
| 
| (7.3 ± 0.1) × 10−10
|
|
|
|
|-
| 
|
|
| 1.5 × 10−30
|
|
|-
| 
| 7.7 × 10−10
| 2.1 × 10−12
| 1 × 10−30
|
|
|-
| 
| (3.8 ± 2.3) × 10−10
| (4 ± 19) × 10−13
| (1.0 ± 0.4) × 10−30
| (4.6 ± 2.1) × 10−29
|
|-
| 
|
|
| 1.5 × 10−31
|
|
|-
| 
|
|
| 5 × 10−31
|
| 2 × 10−8
|-
| 
|
|
|
|
| 3 × 10−7
|-
| 
|
|
|
|
| 3 × 10−8
|-
| 
|
|
|
|
| 2 × 10−7
|-
| 
|
|
|
|
| 1 × 10−7
|}

Reaction (9) has been observed only once, recently. Comparison data are therefore not available. In contrast, the other reactions have been repeatedly observed and quantified.

For kH, three measures are statistically distant from the others. The last (older) two are superior to the others. The first, a recent measure, is the only experiment which proved process (9) which had been neglected. Measurements made by Rives et al., kH must be multiplied by 2 which puts them at the same level as the other values. Taking reaction (9) into account, the set of values of kH must be revised downward except for Rives et al.. A confidence interval is difficult to obtain in these conditions.

For kX, a statistical analysis is very difficult because of the high dispersion of significant absolute values of doubled uncertainties. Lorents provided only an upper limit. Rives et al. results leave open to question whether this process is computable, considering its weak rate constant. Statistically, kX, should not surpass 6.12 cm3s−1. One other (old) measure, had already provided an erroneous value for kH. Another measure was strongly revised downwards six years later.

Reaction (8) which does not lead to the production of * is of negligible importance. The measurements given for kDX are well dispersed and the confidence interval contains only three values. Two of the excluded measurements are of doubtful estimations, while the others are correspondingly direct measures that provided good results. Hanging over kDX is a great uncertainty, but the average value is representative of the overall results, that is, 9.1 cm6s−1.

The measured values of ke display a strong dispersion. Only four values are statistically close The average value of 9.6 cm3s−1 is relatively close to the only direct measure.

Lou also suggested other products for reaction (10):

 + e− →  + Cl− (ke1 = 1.8 cm3s−1) or → Xe* + Cl + e− (ke2 = 1.2 cm3s−1)

Some differences were noticed for reactions of type (6) accounting for the vibrational levels of the collision partners:

(v=0) + HCl(v=1) → Xe + HCl + Cl + Cl (6a) with rate constant of kHa

(v=0) + HCl(v=2) → Xe + HCl + Cl + Cl (6b) with rate constant of kHb

XeCl(B,C;v≠0) + HCl(v=0) → Other products and not XeCl (6c) with rate constant of kHc

The values of the rate constants are summarized in Table 21. They are well dispersed and do not correspond to any direct measurement. These values are specifically based on analogous estimations.

{| class="wikitable" style="text-align:center"
|+ Table 21. Values of kHa, kHb, kHc in cm3s−1.
! Ref
! kHa
! kHb
! kHc
|-
| 
| 7.7 × 10−10
|
|
|-
| 
| 6.3 × 10−10
|
|
|-
| 
| 1.4 × 10−9
|
|
|-
| 
| 7.7 × 10−9
| 7.7 × 10−9
|
|-
| 
|
| 7.7 × 10−10
|
|-
| 
|
| 6.3 × 10−10
|
|-
| 
|
|
| 6.3 × 10−10
|}

Reactions that correspond to reactions (6) and (7) are evident when XeCl is in the ground state of X(v=0). These phenomena affect laser performance and are therefore important. The rate constants are assembled in Table 22. These rates do not vary with the vibrational level of the colliding molecules. Only one direct measurement exists; the others are estimates.

{| class="wikitable" style="text-align:center"
|+ Table 22. Rate constants of disappearance in cm3s−1 through binary collisions. The results are relative to XeCl(X, v = 0) along with another partner, either of Xe, HCl and an electron.
! Ref
! Xe
! HCl
! e−
|-
| 
| (5.6 ± 0.8) × 10−12
| (2.2 ± 0.5) × 10−11
|
|-
| 
| 2.2 × 10−11
| 5.6 × 10−10
|
|-
| 
| 8 × 10−12
|
| 2 × 10−8
|-
| 
|
|
| 7 × 10−8
|}

Role of the buffer gas 

The addition of a third gas in significant quantities also affects the kinetics of disappearance of XeCl(B,C). It induces reactions which are similar to those produced by xenon:

Double collision (11) : XeCl(B,C) + Rg → Xe + Cl + Rg rate constant of k11

Triple collision (12) : XeCl(B,C) + 2 Rg → Xe + Cl + 2 Rg rate constant of k12

Mixed triple collision (13) : XeCl(B,C) + Xe + Rg → 2 Xe + Cl + Rg rate constant of k13

The rate constants of the three processes are grouped in tables 23–25.

{| class="wikitable" style="text-align:center"
|+ Table 23. Values of k11 in cm3s−1 for the different rare gases.
! Ref
! He
! Ne
! Ar
! Kr
|-
| 
| (1.1 ± 0.2) × 10−12
| (0.76 ±0.15) × 10−12
| (1.8 ± 0.5) × 10−12
| (4.0 ± 0.6) × 10−12
|-
| 
| 5 × 10−13
|
|
|
|-
| 
| 1 × 10−12
|
|
|
|-
| 
|
| (1.0 ± 0.3) × 10−12
|
|
|-
| 
|
| 3.3 × 10−13
|
|
|-
| 
|
| 10−11
|
|
|-
| 
|
|
| < 2 × 10−13
|
|}

Reactions (11) and (13) are always important while reaction (12) has a negligible contribution. The results are greatly dispersed. Differences may reach orders of magnitude. Four references have resulted in direct measurements of reaction rates. Others are estimates. These are based on correspondences and only indicative. No information is available for krypton.

{| class="wikitable" style="text-align:center"
|+ Table 24. Values of k12 in cm6s−1 for different rare gases.
! Ref
! He
! Ne
! Ar
! Kr
|-
| 
|
|
| < 3 × 10−33
|
|-
| 
| 5 × 10−34
|
|
|
|-
| 
| 5 × 10−32
|
|
|
|-
| 
|
| 1 × 10−33
|
|
|-
| 
|
| < 1 × 10−33
|
|
|-
| 
|
| 1 × 10−34
|
|
|}

Competitive reactions are evident for the totality of these reactions.

{| class="wikitable" style="text-align:center"
|+ Table 25. Values of k13 in cm6s−1 for different rare gases.
! Ref
! He
! Ne
! Ar
! Kr
|-
| 
|
|
| (3.8 ± 0.2) × 10−30
|
|-
| 
| (2.4 ± 0.5) × 10−31
| (7.4 ± 1.5) × 10−31
| (8.9 ± 1.9) × 10−31
| (9.9 ± 1.9) × 10−31
|-
| 
|
|
| (1.01 ± 0.05) × 10−30
|
|-
| 
| 1.5 × 10−32
| 1.5 × 10−31
|
|
|-
| 
|
| 5 × 10−32
|
|
|-
| 
|
| 1 × 10−31
|
|
|-
| 
| 1.5 × 10−31
|
|
|
|-
| 
|
| 2 × 10−31
|
|
|}

The reactions of (11) are competitive for displacement reactions. In this case, the products are RgCl(B). They have only been observed in the case where Rg = Kr:

 + Kr → KrCl + Xe

The rate constant is 0.7 cm3s−1. Therefore, this reaction is more effective than quenching. It plays an important role in laser kinetics. Table 20 concerns one of the principal pathways of destruction of the exciplex molecule.

For Brashears et al., it is possible to obtain the triatomic complex, Rg, as product. This is a competitive reaction when collisions that produce dissociated atoms occur. Emissions of KrXeCl at 370 nm have been observed, along with ArXeCl at 326 nm and NeXeCl at 434 nm. The rate constants have not been measured, except for Rg=Kr, which is 9 cm6s−1.

However, the creation of ArXeCl seems to be preferential by a competitive reaction (13):

Xe* + Ar + Xe → Ar

The rate constant is 4 cm6s−1. It is then of the same order of magnitude as (13).

However, the synthesis of the * trimer is the most frequent competitive reaction of (13).

For helium, Baginskii et al. provided a solution using  + Cl + He of which the rate constant is 1.5 cm6s−1.

A corresponding reaction for (11) was demonstrated for XeCl at the ground state. The rate constants are summarized in Table 26. The measurements are greatly dispersed (only one is direct) and data on krypton are absent. The others are based, more or less, on estimates. Amongst these, one is statistically distant from the others. On using neon, the rate constant for XeCl(X, v=1) has been estimated as 1 cm3s−1.

{| class="wikitable" style="text-align:center"
|+ Table 26. Rate constants of disappearance in cm3s−1 through binary collisions relative to XeCl(X, v=0) for various buffer gases.
! Ref
! He
! Ne
! Ar
! Kr
|-
| 
| 5 × 10−12
|
|
|
|-
| 
| 9.8 × 10−11
|
|
|
|-
| 
| 3 × 10−12
|
|
|
|-
| 
|
| (1.0 ± 0.15) × 10−13
| (0.6 ± 0.06) × 10−13
|
|-
| 
|
| 1 × 10−11
|
|
|-
| 
|
| 1 × 10−12
|
|
|-
| 
|
| 8 × 10−12
|
|
|-
| 
|
| 5 × 10−11
|
|
|}

Other chlorine donors and other reactions 
The main reactions are those corresponding to reaction (6):

 + RCl → Other products and not XeCl (14) rate constant of kR

The three chlorine donors studied (HCl,  and ) have rates of quenching of the same order of magnitude.

{| class="wikitable" style="text-align:center"
|+ Table 27. Rate constants in cm3s−1 relative to reactions (14) for XeCl (B, C ; v’ = 0,1).
! Ref
! 
! 
|-
| 
| (4.3 ± 0.2) × 10−10
|
|-
| 
| (5.6 ± 0.25) × 10−10
|
|-
| 
| 5 × 10−10
|
|-
| 
| 5.9 × 10−10
|
|-
| 
| 5.8 × 10−10
|
|-
| 
|
| (4.6 ± 0.2) × 10−10
|}

All the measurements in Table 27 were experimental. For chlorine, only one (recent) value is statistically distant from the others. The absolute difference is not very great versus the other determinations.

For chlorine, Grieneisen et al. pointed to two different values for the rate constant for states B and C. They were respectively estimated as (8.8 ± 1.5) cm3s−1 and (3.3 ± 0.3) cm3s−1. This is a direct measure of the process of destruction through binary collision with  that includes all the phenomena and not just quenching. As states B and C are energetically close, collisional coupling is acting on the two states. A similar result for xenon seems to reinforce this hypothesis.

Some atoms of free chlorine exist in the conditions which matter for lasers. The following quenching reactions is provided for:

 + Cl → Xe + 2Cl

Two authors have estimated the rate constant: 1.4 cm3s−1 and 8 cm3s−1.

The presence of impurities, Im, such as the chlorocarbons (the consequence of corrosion), NO, CO, O, O could have an effect on the chemical kinetics of disappearance of  since binary collisions Im– possess rate constants of the order of 3 cm3s−1, thus making them comparable to the  + RCl reaction. However, given the usual impurity levels, the reaction frequencies are negligible.

Process of collisional coupling between states B and C

In binary mixtures of Xe/HCl 

The weak energetic gap (about 100 cm−1) between these two states (Table 2), suggests that a coupling was produced. However, this result was not exactly quantified nor was it later confirmed. No collisional coupling phenomenon induced by chlorine has been detected recently.

The role of electrons is also not well known in the coupling process. According to Finn et al., its role is negligible, although Johnson et al. gave an elevated rate constant. This rate is the same, according to them, for B to C and C to B transfers. The energy difference between B and C is not zero (see Table 2). The reaction rate was estimated at 2 cm3s−1.

These couplings are demonstrated through binary collisions using an atom of xenon:

XeCl(B ; v’ = 0) + Xe → XeCl(C ; v’ = 0,1) + Xe (15) rate constant of kBC

XeCl(C ; v’ = 0, 1) + Xe → XeCl(B ; v’ = 0) + Xe (16) rate constant of kCB

The measurements of rate constants are not very consistent as can be seen in Table 28.

{| class="wikitable" style="text-align:center"
|+ Table 28. Rate constants in cm3s−1 of the collisional coupling processes of states B and C.
! Ref
! kBC
! kCB
|-
| 
| (11.0 ± 0.3) × 10−11
| (7.4 ± 0.3) × 10−11
|-
| 
| 13.5 × 10−11
| 15 × 10−11
|-
| 
| (7.21 ± 1.97) × 10−12
| (4.08 ± 1.97) × 10−12
|-
| 
| 5 × 10−11
|
|}
r
In experiments by Inoue et al., the vibrational levels v’=0.1 were directly excited. This is not the case in other experiments. The last value is only a theoretical estimation based on similarities with other reactions. The energetic gap ΔE = EB – EC deduced from kCB and kBC, suggests that further information could follow. Assuming that the states EB and EC were thermalized:

kBC/kCB = exp(ΔE/kT) since the statistical weights of the two states are the same.

ΔE, was also inferred by Inoue et al. as 85 cm−1, and as 119 cm−1 by Rives et al., while 22 cm−1 was the measurement given by Le Calvé et al. (see Table 2). Only the first two values are values of ΔE which are compatible with 100 cm−1, the accepted order of magnitude. A clear difference exists between these two; an order of magnitude separates the values of kBC and kCB in the two experiments. Grieneisen et al. provided only the global rate of destruction of states B and C, in other words, quenching and coupling. For the destruction of state C, they found (15.5 ± 0.9) cm3s−1 and for state B (10.3 ± 0.9) cm3s−1, which are intermediate values between those of Inoue et al. and Rives et al.. Recall that quenching by xenon only has a weak influence (Table 20). Inoue et al. notably did not take account of reaction (9). If the same approach is taken for the results by Rives et al., the values of kBC and kCB are close to those of Inoue et al.. As was explained for kx and kH, taking account of the process (9) modifies the values of the reaction rate. On this point, Rives et al. is more precise than Inoue et al..

The advantage of Inoue et al.s result was in vibrational resolution, as kBC and kCB vary with the vibrational level v. For level v=70 to 130, rate constants between 15 and 20 cm3s−1 were observed. kBC and kCB seems to then grow with v.

Since most of the time XeCl(B, C) is formed with a strong vibrational excitation, knowledge of the exact estimate of the variation of kBC and kCB with v; and the chemical kinetics of the vibrational relaxation and its importance relative vis-à-vis to the coupling process are important.

 The role of the buffer gas 

Collisional coupling is produced by binary collisions with an atom of a rare gas, Rg:

XeCl(B) + Rg → XeCl(C) + Rg (17) rate constant of kBCRg

XeCl(C) + Rg → XeCl(B) + Rg (18) rate constant of kCBRg

Dreiling and Setser provide order of magnitude values for kBCRg and kCBRg for a given vibrational level. The results are shown in Table 29.

{| class="wikitable" style="text-align:center"
|+ Table 29. Coupling rate constants in cm3s−1 by binary collisions using an atom of rare gas.
! v
! He
! Ne
! Ar
! Kr
|-
| 0–30
| (0.5 to 1.8) × 10−11
| (0.7 to 2.6) × 10−11
| (3.0 to 11) × 10−11
| (3.0 to 11) × 10−11
|-
| 30–70
| (1.8 to 2.5) × 10−11
| (2.6 to 3.5) × 10−11
| (11 to 15) × 10−11
| (11.0 to 16) × 10−11
|-
| 70–130
| 2.5 × 10−11
| 3.5 × 10−11
| 15 × 10−11
| 16 × 10−11
|}

Using helium, experiments have been made at low and high pressures. At high pressures, the transfer constants are of the order of (1.5 ± 0.7) cm3s−1 and at low pressures 3.0 cm3s−1. A strong pressure induces a vibrational relaxation such that the values of v involved in the transfer are weak and vice versa for weak pressures. The only available direct determination for kBCHe gives a value less than 3 cm3s−1.

For neon, the values of the rate of transfer at low and high pressure are respectively, 3.0 cm3s−1 and (0.8 ± 0.4) cm3s−1. They are inferior to those of Table 29. The direct measurement of the rate constant  gives a value less than 3.10−13 cm3s−1. Finally, according to Ohwa, the order of magnitude of the two rate of coupling constants would be 4.8 cm3s−1 for v=4.

For argon, the results increase. At low pressures, the order of magnitude would only be 6.0 cm3s−1. Other authors published rates of transfer of 1.2 ± 0.4 cm3s−1 for a pressure interval starting from 10 to 1000 torr.

 = 36 cm3s−1 and  = 21 cm3s−1

Meanwhile, Yu et al. noted a variation with temperature of :

 = (4 ± 2) cm3s−1 at 300K and  = (2 ± 1) cm3s−1 at 230K.

For krypton, we can only make an estimation:

 = (4) cm3s−1.

It is clear that the collisional coupling process induced by the rare gases are not well established. Different authors give different order of magnitudes. The uncertainty on the rate constants is therefore as important as for that of xenon. The vibrational excitation seems to play a role that is still not well defined. Direct measurements for kBCRg and kCBRg are not available. From the first estimations, the phenomena seem important in the kinetics of gaseous mixtures.

 Vibrational relaxation 
 is more often synthesized with strong vibrational excitation and can reach vibration quantum numbers as high as v=100. This induces some vibrational relaxation that is formed by binary collision with an atom of a rare gas.

Only a single measurement for xenon and level v=2 has been published.

XeCl(B; v = 2) + Xe → XeCl(B; v’ = 0.1) + Xe rate constant of kv

where kv = (2 ± 1) cm3s−1.

Most of the known results are related to buffer gases. Yet, only Dreiling and Sester completed measurements. The vibrational relaxation can be written as:

(v) + Rg → (v’) + Rg (19)

Values of kvRg are assumed to be the same for states B and C.

{| class="wikitable" style="text-align:center"
|+ Table 30 : Vibrational relaxation rate constants in cm3s−1 induced by binary collisions with an atom of a buffer gas, Rg.
! v
! He
! Ne
! Ar
! Kr
|-
| 0–30
| (0.15 to 1.1) × 10−11
| (0.5 to 2.9) × 10−11
| (1.0 to 6.0) × 10−11
| (0.6 to 2.7) × 10−11
|-
| 30–70
| (1.1 to 2.5) × 10−11
| (2.9 to 6.2) × 10−11
| (6.0 to 12) × 10−11
| (2.7 to 5.5) × 10−11
|-
| 70–130
| (2.5 to 4.4) × 10−11
| (6.2 to 9.5) × 10−11
| (20 to 34) × 10−11
| (5.5 to 7.3) × 10−11
|}

For helium and krypton, no comparison is available.

For neon, only the reaction with first two vibrational levels of B have been documented:

XeCl(B; v = 1) + Ne → XeCl(B ; v = 0) + Ne with rate constant of kvNe=(0.3 to 0.5) cm3s−1.

For argon, the values of kvAr has been determined for v=33, 60 and 75. Their values, respectively, are (17 ± 5); (31 ± 9) and (43 ± 10) cm−11. Other authors placed the figure for kvAr between (10 and 15) agreeing on the order of magnitude.

 Disappearance pathways of the exciplex molecule 

The chemical kinetics due to collisional coupling of states B and C and vibrational relaxation are not well known. The few available results often disagree, although a general idea of the situation is possible. For high vibrational levels, coupling overrides the vibrational relaxation while the contrary is true for the lowest levels, even if a rare gas is involved.

The various destructive processes of XeCl(B), differ in importance. A mixture optimized for lasers is used. Neon is favored over argon because the latter strongly absorbs via the  ion at 308 nm. Therefore, a ternary mixture (Ne/Xe/HCl) is used. The total pressure is fixed at 3 atm, the respective partial pressures is 2268.6 torr, 10 torr and 1.4 torr. The rate constants are the average values of the most reliable estimates.

The results are summarized in Table 31. For reaction (19), only the lowest vibrational levels are accounted. The lower frequency of disappearance limit is 0.40 ns−1. This process induces the highest destruction, indicating that XeCl(B) synthesized with high vibrational excitation is quickly relaxed by binary collision with neon and (probably) also by xenon. This suggests that other processes are really noticeable only after XeCl(B) is on the v=0 level, which is why reaction (17) uses the value of k   relative to a low v. Once the relaxation is complete other processes take over. Depopulation by spontaneous emission is very important as well as reactions (11) and (17). These two processes lack refined measurements and determinations overall. The role of the xenon coupling is not better known but has less influence than the destruction by binary collision with HCl. Other better known processes are negligible. In particular all termolecular reactions are negligible.

{| class="wikitable" style="text-align:center"
|+ Table 31 : Frequency of destruction of states B in ns−1.
! Processes
! Radiative pathway
! 6
! 7
! 8
! 9
! 11
! 12
! 13
! 15
! 17
! 19
|-
| Frequency
| 0.099
| 0.036
| 0.001
| 0.0001
| 0.0008
| 0.24
| 0.0006
| 0.0074
| 0.027
| 0.064
| 0.40
|-
| Percentage
| 11%
| 4%
| < 1%
| < 1%
| < 1%
| 27%
| < 1%
| 1%
| 3%
| 7%
| 46%
|-
| Percentage after vibrational relaxation
| 21%
| 8%
| < 1%
| < 1%
| < 1%
| 50%
| < 1%
| 2%
| 6%
| 13%
|
|}

 The  exciplex molecule 

Generally, Rg2X molecules are less stable than RgX.  is of double interest. It can cause perturbations in laser XeCl performance because it absorbs well at 308 nm and enables the development of another type of laser based on an  emission.

 The  molecule 

Initial studies on the  molecule found:

 Its most stable configuration in the excited state has a triangular geometry C2v.
 The observed emission of the molecule is broad; the corresponding transitions result in a very repulsive ground state.

The potential curves calculated by Huestis et al. from the DIM (Diatomics In Molecules) method are presented in Figure 15.

The three lowest states are covalent and repulsive. They are correlated to XeCl(X or A) and to an atom of xenon at the ground state. The experimental value of the energy at state 12Γ is 0.273 eV. It is compatible with these potential curves. The following three states are ionic. The bound state 42Γ is correlated to XeCl(B) + Xe; the following, 52Γ, a repulsive state, is correlated to XeCl(C) + Xe.

Last and George made a determination of the potential curves using another method, the DIIS (Diatomics In Ionic Systems) method without considering spin-orbital coupling. They found, like Huestis et al. that the 42Γ state is the lowest ionic state. At the bottom of the well, this state has the configuration of an isosceles triangle, such that the distance between the equilibrium positions of Xe and Cl is 3.23 Å. According to Adams and Chabalowski the Xe–Cl distance is 3.39 Å.

Initially, the potential curves of the different states were plotted by maintaining a constant and equal Xe-Xe distance at 3.25 Å (figure 16). Last and George discovered nine states (three covalent and six ionic). The potential curves of the antisymmetric states 42Γπ and 62Γπ are almost coincident with the potential curves of the symmetric states 52Γ and 62Γ. The 32Γ and 72Γ states highlighted by Huestin et al. are absent since the spin-orbital coupling were not taken into account. Inversely, three states, (22Γπ, 42Γπ and 62Γπ) with the π symmetry, were not included in their diagrams.

A second study kept the separation of Xe-Cl at 3.23 Å (figure 17).* In 42Γπ state, the molecule with isosceles triangle configuration such as the Xe-Cl and Xe-Xe distances are respectively 3.13 and 4.23 Å. The state is 0.8 eV above the 42Γ state.* At the ground state, 12Γ forms a Van der Waals complex. It has a bond-dissociation energy of 0.075eV and a dissymmetric triangular configuration. The Xe–Cl distances are 3.23 and 4.06 Å and the Xe–Cl–Xe angle is 74.4°.*''' The second excited state 22Γ is also a Van der Waals complex. It has a symmetrical geometry and an Xe–Cl distance of 3.99 Å with an Xe–Cl–Xe angle of 68.4°. Its dissociation energy is 0.055 eV.

Another way of describing Xe–Cl–Xe finds the stable state to be linear and symmetric. At the ground state, the Xe-Cl distance should be 3.24 Å and the dissociation energy 0.076 eV. An excited state could exist with a geometric distance of Xe-Cl of 3.06 Å. This state, which is not shown in Figures 16 and 17, would possess an energy higher than 0.72 eV to that of the 42Γ state. The bonding would be ionic.

Only an experiment conducted at the solid state can be compared to these theoretical results. The special state studied was the 42Γ state. The isosceles triangle structure of this state was confirmed. Three quantities can be compared with theoretical predictions. The Xe-Xe distance is measured at 3.17 Å and that of Xe-Cl at 3 Å. The agreement in values is best for the energy at the bottom of the well that was evaluated at 3.15 eV. The fundamental vibrational frequencies for Xe–Xe, is ωx = 123 cm−1 and for Xe–Cl, ωc = 180 cm−1.

 Synthetic pathways 

Three principal pathways of  synthesis are energetically possible through collisions and two others through photodissociation:

(A1Σ) +  →  + Cl (20)

 + Xe + Rg →  + Rg (21)

+ + Cl− + Rg →  + Rg (22)

(X) + Xe + hν →  (23)

Xe + Cl + Xe + hν →  (24)

where Rg is a rare gas, probably xenon or a buffer gas.

The authors disagree on the relative importance of these synthetic processes. The processes depend on experimental conditions.

 Through harpoon reactions 

Reaction (20) is a very energetic harpoon reaction. It involves  excited state. According to Bruce et al., this is the dominant synthetic pathway. Other authors though do not share this view since they believe that this reaction is weak, or indeed negligible. Its rate constant has not yet been measured.

 The photoassociative pathway 

Reactions (23) and (24) were only recently discovered.

 The ionic pathway 

The same authors later revised this value downward as: α’ = 5 cm3s−1. This result was confirmed experimentally.

 The ternary reactions 

According to a recent study, the reaction can be interpreted as the result of two successive reactions, the second reaction corresponding to a vibrational relaxation through collision using Rg:

XeCl(B,C) + Xe ↔ 

 + Rg →  + Rg

 + Rg →  where Rg≠Xe

 + Xe →  Rg

These reactions have been observed in only argon and krypton.

The second reaction is one of displacement. Another reaction is competitive to it when xenon is replaced by krypton. This quenching process should have a rate constant higher than 1 cm3s−1.

The lifetime of the  complex is not well known. It is estimated at 200 ns for KrXeCl and 40 ns for NeXeCl. This interval in time is sufficient for the second collision to have a chance of being produced.

The rate constants have been measured as summarized in table 32. If Rg≠Xe, only two direct measurements have been carried out. The last is only an evaluation.

{| class="wikitable" style="text-align:center"
|+ Table 32 : Rate constants in cm6s−1 of the reaction (21).
! Ref
! He
! Ne
! Ar
! Kr
|-
| 
|
|
| (1.5 ± 0.5) × 10−31
|
|-
| 
| (3.1 ± 1.3) × 10−31
| (6.0 ± 1.6) × 10−31
| (9.4 ± 2.4) × 10−31
| (14 ± 2) × 10−31
|-
| 
|
| (1.5) × 10−31
|
|
|}

As for xenon, notice that the totality of the kDX constants of table 20 could be taken as those of the fifth column of table 32 since kDX could be merged with reaction (21).

 Paths of disappearance 

 The radiative pathway 

 Emission spectra 

Theoretical studies show that the allowed transitions are (figure 15) :

42Γ → 12Γ (A)

42Γ → 22Γ (B)

42Γ → 32Γ (C)

The starting states are always the same and the corresponding wavelengths, λTh, are indicated in Table 33. They can be compared to experimental values, λObs.

{| class="wikitable" style="text-align:center"
|+ Table 33 : Characteristics of  emissions.
! Transition
! Experiment:  (nm)
! Theoretical estimates: λTh (nm)
! Theoretical estimates: relative importance
! Theoretical estimates: transition moment (D)
|-
| (A)
| 450
| 495
| Dominant
| 2.45
|-
| (B)
| 490
| 514
| Important
| 0.1
|-
| (C)
|
| 541
| 100 times weaker
|
|}

Experimentally, Fajardo and Apkarian observed two transitions (A) and (B) in the spectral domain, even while there was a significant wavelength shift. In most cases, a very large continuum (approximately 80 nm) was observed covering the three emissions. The maximum positioning oscillated between 450 and 500 nm. An example of this sort of spectrum is given in Figure 11. On computation, the limits of short wavelength emissions were evaluated at 443 nm.

According to Last and George, the Xe–Cl–Xe linear molecule ought to have produced an emission approaching the ground state at 321 nm and the transition moment should be elevated to 3.9 D. As of 2014, however, no experiment confirms this prediction.

At the solid state, the  emission shifts towards the red range and is centered around 570 nm. A corresponding result is observed in the liquid state. This phenomenon should be owed to a distortion of the potential curves arising from molecular interactions which are closest to themselves than at the gaseous state. A theoretical study attributes this to the polarization of the xenon matrix by +Cl− and by Van der Waals forces.

Emission of  trimer is only observed at high pressures of the rare gas (xenon or buffer gas) and fluorescence increases with the pressure of xenon. Considering the values of the rate constant of reactions of type (21), the reaction frequency does not deviate in a significant way even when the rare gas pressure is close to 200 torr. Reaction (22) only takes place under pressure of several atmospheres.

The only state where  is the original parent of a luminous emission is 42Γ). Several determinations of its lifetime obtained at the gaseous state are summarized in Table 34. The results vary and the uncertainties involved are important. The confidence interval obtained within a threshold of 5% lies between 240 and 253 ns. Of these, four values are not included. Given the strong absolute uncertainty, another measure has a common interval within the confidence interval.

{| class="wikitable" style="text-align:center"
|+ Table 34 : Lifetime of Cl(42Γ) experimentally obtained at the gaseous state, excepting for the reference given by Stevens and Krauss which is a theoretical determination.
! Lifetime (ns)
! Reference
|-
| 300 ± 50
| 
|-
| 185 ± 10
| 
|-
| 260
| 
|-
| 135+70−60
| 
|-
| 210 ± 25
| 
|-
| 250 ± 25
| 
|-
| 245 ± 10
| 
|-
| 328 ± 20
| 
|-
| 250
| 
|-
| 330
| 
|-
| 210 ± 20
| 
|-
| 242 ± 10
| 
|}

Measurements realized at the solid state provide values that are yet more dispersed such as is shown in Table 35.

{| class="wikitable" style="text-align:center"
|+ Table 35 : Lifetime of Cl(42Γ) observed at the solid state.
! Matrix
! Lifetime (ns)
! References
|-
| Ar
| 460
| 
|-
| Ne
| 260 ± 15
| 
|-
| Kr
| 450
| 
|-
| Xe
| 663
| 
|-
| Xe
| 225 ± 10
| 
|}

 The collision pathway 

 The role of chlorine donors (RCl) 

In practical terms, every author agrees that double collision is the dominant destruction pathway of  when collision is involved, whatever the chlorine donor. Therefore,  emissions are only observed at weak concentrations of RCl. The values of the rate constants for reactions (24) are given in Table 36.

 + RCl → Other products except  (24)

{| class="wikitable" style="text-align:center"
|+ Table 36 : Rate constants in cm3s−1 of reactions (24) for various donors of chlorine, RCl.
! Reference
! 
! HCl
! 
|-
| 
| (2.2 ± 0.2) × 10−10
| (4.3 ± 0.4) × 10−10
| (5.4 ± 0.5) × 10−10
|-
| 
|
| (6.1 ± 0.2) × 10−10
|
|-
| 
|
| 2.6 × 10−10
|
|-
| 
|
| 8 × 10−10
|
|-
| 
|
| 6.1 × 10−10
|
|-
| 
|
| 6 × 10−10
|
|-
| 
| (3.9 ± 0.4) × 10−10
|
|
|-
| 
| (4.5 ± 0.4) × 10−10
|
|
|-
| 
| (2.6 ± 0.3) × 10−10
|
|
|-
| 
| (4 ± 1) × 10−10
|
|
|-
| 
| (7 ± 1) × 10−10
|
|
|-
| 
| (4.0 ± 1) × 10−10-10
|
|
|-
| 
| 1.8 × 10−10
|
|
|-
| 
|
|
| (6 ± 1) × 10−10
|}

For HCl, two values are statistically distant from others. Giving an explanation for this distance remains difficult. The confidence interval at a threshold of 5% is from 4 to 7 cm3s−1.

In the case of chlorine, only one half of measurements are statistically close. Even so, this closeness is difficult to explain. Its confidence interval at the threshold of 5% varies from 3.7 to 4.5 cm3s−1.

To estimate the rate constant of the reaction:

 + Cl → 2 Xe + 2 Cl

The value is 1 cm3s−1.

 The role of rare gases 

These are uniquely binary reactions:

 + Rg → Other products except  (25)

However, this reaction has not been demonstrated by other authors. The upper bound of the rate constant of reaction (25) is 1 cm3s−1, although other authors placed this limit at 4 to 7 cm3s−1 or 5 cm3s−1. The value used by Kannari et al.'', 8 cm3s−1, has no basis.

For ternary mixtures, the role of the buffer gas is not well known.

For argon, (3 ± 1) cm3s−1 and (1.5 ± 0.4) cm3s−1 are available.

For helium, 5 cm3s−1 and 3 cm3s−1 are available.

The role of electrons and impurities 

The rate of reactions of  + e− → 2 Xe + Cl + e− (26) does not have consistent estimates. They are summarized in Table 37.

{| class="wikitable" style="text-align:center"
|+ Table 37 : Rate constants of reaction (26) in cm3s−1.
! Rate constants
! Reference
|-
| 2 × 10−7
| 
|-
| 9 × 10−9
| 
|-
| 2 × 10−8
| 
|-
| 4 × 10−9
| 
|}

Impurity levels, most often low, may influence the measurements. The reaction frequencies are negligible.

See also 
 Excimer lamp
 Absorption spectroscopy
 Collisional excitation
 Harpoon reactions
 Reaction rate

References 

Xenon compounds
Chlorides
Nonmetal halides